Le Téméraire is a  ballistic missile submarine of the French Navy, launched in January 1998, and commissioned in December 1999, six months behind schedule. The boat had, in May 1999, successfully test launched an M45 submarine-launched ballistic missile.

See also 
 List of submarines of France

References 

Triomphant-class submarines
Ships built in France
1998 ships
Submarines of France